Gangajalghati is a community development block (CD block) that forms an administrative division in  the Bankura Sadar subdivision of the Bankura district in the Indian state of West Bengal.

History

From Bishnupur kingdom to the British Raj

From around the 7th century AD till around the advent of British rule, for around a millennium, history of Bankura district is identical with the rise and fall of the Hindu Rajas of Bishnupur. The Bishnupur Rajas, who were at the summit of their fortunes towards the end of the 17th century, started declining in the first half of the 18th century. First, the Maharaja of Burdwan seized the Fatehpur Mahal, and then the Maratha invasions laid waste their country.

Bishnupur was ceded to the British with the rest of Burdwan chakla in 1760. In 1787, Bishnupur was united with Birbhum to form a separate administrative unit. In 1793 it was transferred to the Burdwan collectorate. In 1879, the district acquired its present shape with the thanas of Khatra and Raipur and the outpost of Simplapal being transferred from Manbhum, and the thanas of Sonamukhi, Kotulpur and Indas being retransferred from Burdwan. However, it was known for sometime as West Burdwan and in 1881 came to be known as Bankura district.

Geography

It has an average elevation of 110 metres (361 feet).

Gangajalghati CD block is located in the north-western part of the district. The Main Bankura Upland, of which Gangajalghati CD block is a part, is characterised by undulating terrain with many hills and ridges. The area is having a gradual descent from the Chota Nagpur Plateau. The soil is laterite red and hard beds are covered with scrub jungle and sal wood.

Gangajalghati CD block is bounded by Mejia CD block on the north, Barjora CD block on the east, Bankura II CD block on the south and Chhatna and Saltora CD blocks on the west.

Gangajalghati CD block has an area of 366.47 km2. It has 1 panchayat samity, 10 gram panchayats, 138 gram sansads (village councils), 165 mouzas and 156 inhabited villages. Gangajalghati police station serves this block. Headquarters of this CD block is at Amarkanan.

Gram panchayats of Gangajalghati block/ panchayat samiti are: Ban Asuria, Barsol, Bhaktabandh, Gangajalghati, Gobindadham, Kapista, Lachmanpur, Latiabani, Nityandapur and Pirrabani.

Demographics

Population
According to the 2011 Census of India Gangajalghati CD block had a total population of 180,974, all of which were rural. There were 93,252 (52%) males and 87,722 (48%) females. Population in the age range of 0 to 6 years was 21,412. Scheduled Castes numbered 63,832 (35.27%) and Scheduled Tribes numbered 7,160 (3.96%).

In the 2001 census, Gangajalghati community development bloc had a total population of 161,919 of which 83,060 were males and 78,869 were females. Decadal growth for the period 1991-2001 was 12.76% for Gangajalghati, against 13.79% in Bankura district. Decadal growth in West Bengal was 17.84%.

Large villages (with 4,000+ population) in Gangajalghati CD block are (2011 census figures in brackets): Gangajalghati (8,798), Keshiara (6,922) and Bhairabpur (4,669).

Other villages in Gangajalghati CD block are (2011 census figures in brackets): Pirrabani (2,252), Kapistha (3,757), Gobinda Dham (3,650), Lachmanpur (3,117), Latiabani (2,847), Barsal (2,550), Nityanandapur (2,151), Ban Ashuria (2,078) and Bhakta Band (1,850).

Literacy
According to the 2011 census the total number of literates in Gangajalghati CD block was 108,675 (68.11% of the population over 6 years) out of which males numbered 65,451 (79.79% of the male population over 6 years) and females numbered 43,224 (55.75%) of the female population over 6 years). The gender disparity (the difference between female and male literacy rates) was 24.04%.

See also – List of West Bengal districts ranked by literacy rate

Language and religion
According to the District Census Handbook 2011, Bankura, as of 2001, Bengali was the mother-tongue of 89.9% of the population, followed by Santali (8.1%), Kurmali Thar (1.1%), Hindi (0.5%) and Telugu (0.1%).

According to the West Bengal Official Language Act 1961 and the West Bengal Official Language (Amendment Act) 2012, the Bengali language is to be used for official purposes in the whole of West Bengal. In addition to Bengali, the Nepali language is to be used for official purposes in the three hills subdivisions, namely Darjeeling, Kalimpong and Kurseong, in the district of Darjeeling, and Urdu is to be used for official purposes in district/subdivision/ block/ municipality where the population speaking Urdu exceeds 10% of the total population.  The English language will continue to be used for official purposes as it was being used prior to the enactment of these laws.

The West Bengal Official Language (Second Amendment) Bill, 2012, included Hindi, Santhali, Odiya and Punjabi as official languages  if it is spoken by a population exceeding 10 per cent of the whole in a particular block or sub-division or a district.  Subsequently, Kamtapuri, Rajbanshi and Kurmali were also included in the list of minority languages by the West Bengal Official Language (Second Amendment) Bill, 2018. However, as of 2019, there is no official / other reliable information about the areas covered.

In the 2011 census Hindus numbered 176,168 and formed 97.34% of the population in Gangajalghati CD Block. Muslims numbered 279 and formed 0.15% of the population. Christians numbered 82 and formed 0.05% of the population. Others numbered 4,445 and formed 2.46% of the population. Others include Addi Bassi, Marang Boro, Santal, Saranath, Sari Dharma, Sarna, Alchchi, Bidin, Sant, Saevdharm, Seran, Saran, Sarin, Kheria, and other religious communities.

Rural poverty
In Gangajalghati CD Block 41.08% families were living below poverty line in 2007. According to the Rural Household Survey in 2005, 28.87% of the total number of families were BPL families in the Bankura district.

Economy

Livelihood

In the Gangajalghati CD block in 2011, among the class of total workers, cultivators numbered 16,856 and formed 24.33%, agricultural labourers numbered 25,301 and formed 36.51%, household industry workers numbered 2,571 and formed 3.71% and other workers numbered 24,563 and formed 35.45%. Total workers numbered 69,291 and formed 38.29% of the total population, and non-workers numbered 111,683 and formed 61.71% of the population.

Note: In the census records a person is considered a cultivator, if the person is engaged in cultivation/ supervision of land owned by self/government/institution. When a person who works on another person's land for wages in cash or kind or share, is regarded as an agricultural labourer. Household industry is defined as an industry conducted by one or more members of the family within the household or village, and one that does not qualify for registration as a factory under the Factories Act. Other workers are persons engaged in some economic activity other than cultivators, agricultural labourers and household workers.  It includes factory, mining, plantation, transport and office workers, those engaged in business and commerce, teachers, entertainment artistes and so on.

Infrastructure
There are 156 inhabited villages in the Gangajalghati CD block, as per the District Census Handbook, Bankura, 2011. 100% villages have power supply. 153 villages (98.08%) have drinking water supply. 22 villages (14.10%) have post offices. 124 villages (79.49%) have telephones (including landlines, public call offices and mobile phones). 53 villages (33.97%) have pucca (paved) approach roads and 34 villages (21.79%) have transport communication (includes bus service, rail facility and navigable waterways). 11 villages (7.05%) have agricultural credit societies and 7 villages (4.49%) have  banks.

Agriculture
There were 47 fertiliser depots, 6 seed stores and 59 fair price shops in the CD block.

In Bankura district in 2010-11, 34.92% of the operational holdings were held in marginal holdings of less than 1 hectare by 68.22% of the holders. Another 31.16% of the operational holdings were held in small holdings between 1 and 2 hectares by 21.05% of the holders. In Bankura district, 23,389 hectares of vested land was distributed amongst 191,915 beneficiaries up to 31 October 2013.

In 2013-14, persons engaged in agriculture in Gangajalghati CD block could be classified as follows: bargadars 7.85%, patta (document) holders 12.32%, small farmers (possessing land between 1 and 2 hectares) 6.90%, marginal farmers (possessing land up to 1 hectare) 22.37% and agricultural labourers 50.56%.

In 2003-04 net area sown in Gangajalghati CD block was 22,335 hectares and the area in which more than one crop was grown was 893 hectares.

In 2013-14, the total area irrigated in Gangajalghati CD block was 7,268 hectares, out of which 443 hectares was by canal water, 6,095 hectares by tank water, 480 hectares by river lift irrigation, 5 hectares by shallow tubewells and 245 hectares by open dug wells.

In 2013-14, Gangajalghati CD block produced 5,781 tonnes of Aman paddy, the main winter crop, from 2.109 hectares, 12 tonnes of wheat from 12 hectares and 29,539,000 tonnes of potatoes from 1,010 hectares. It also produced pulses and mustard.

Power
In 1996 Mejia Thermal Power Station was set up by Damodar Valley Corporation at Durlabhpur. It has an installed capacity of 2340 MW – 4 units of 210 MW each, 2 units of 250 MW each and 2 units of 500 MW each.

Handloom and pottery industries
The handloom industry engages the largest number of persons in the non farm sector and hence is important in Bankura district. The handloom industry is well established in all the CD blocks of the district and includes the famous Baluchari saris. In 2004-05 Gangajalghati CD Block had 427 looms in operation.

Bankura district is famous for the artistic excellence of its pottery products that include the famous Bankura horse. The range of pottery products is categorised as follows: domestic utilities, terracota and other decorative items and roofing tiles and other heavy pottery items. Around 3,200 families were involved in pottery making in the district in 2002. 65 families were involved in Gangajalghati CD block.

Banking
In 2013-14, Gangajalghati CD block had offices of 6 commercial banks and 4 gramin banks.

Backward Regions Grant Fund
The Bankura district is listed as a backward region and receives financial support from the Backward Regions Grant Fund. The fund, created by the Government of India, is designed to redress regional imbalances in development. As of 2012, 272 districts across the country were listed under this scheme. The list includes 11 districts of West Bengal.

Transport
In 2013-14, Gangajalghati CD Block had 9 originating/ terminating bus routes. The nearest railway station is 15 km from the CD block headquarters.

NH 14, (old numbering NH 60), running from Morgram to Kharagpur, passes through this CD block.

Education
In 2013-14, Gangajalghati CD block had 166 primary schools with 13,461 students, 14 middle schools with 2,961 students, 11 high schools with 7,484 students and 12 higher secondary schools with 8,337 students. Gangajalghati CD block had 1 general college with 1,312 students, 1 professional/ technical institution with 63 students and 280 institutions for special and non-formal education with 8,522 students. Gangajalghati CD block had 10 mass literacy centres.

See also – Education in India

According to the 2011 census, in the Gangajalghati CD block, among the 156 inhabited villages, 19 villages did not have a school, 38 villages had two or more  primary schools, 39 villages had at least 1 primary and 1 middle school and 23 villages had at least 1 middle and 1 secondary school.

Gobindaprasad Mahavidyalaya was established at Amarkanan in 1985 to pay homage to Gobinda Prasad Singha, an Indian independence activist.

Healthcare
In 2014, Gangajalghati CD block had 1 rural hospital, 3 primary health centres and 1 private nursing home with total 75 beds and 8 doctors. It had 30 family welfare sub centres and 1 family welfare centre. 6,832 patients were treated indoor and 260,807 patients were treated outdoor in the hospitals, health centres and subcentres of the CD block.

Gangajalgati (Amar Kanan) Rural Hospital, with 30 beds at PO Amarkanan, is the major government medical facility in the Gangjalghati CD block. There are primary health centres at Gangajalghati (with 4 beds), Ramharipur (with 4 beds) and Srichandrapur (with 10 beds).

See also
 Gangajalghati (Vidhan Sabha constituency)

External links

References

Community development blocks in Bankura district